The following list of Oto-Manguean languages includes languages by ISO 639-3 code and their respective geographical distributions as given by Ethnologue (22nd edition).

Languages

References

See also
Classification of Mixtec languages
Municipalities of Oaxaca
List of Mayan languages

Oto-Manguean